Nelson R. Norton (November 8, 1809 in Hampton, New York – ?) was a member of the Wisconsin State Assembly. He later built the first schooner on Lake Michigan.

Career
Norton was a member of the Assembly in 1854. He was a Democrat.

References

People from Hampton, New York
Democratic Party members of the Wisconsin State Assembly
1809 births
Year of death missing